Nectria foliicola is a fungal plant pathogen.

References

Fungal plant pathogens and diseases
foliicola
Fungi described in 1868